The 2015 Lahore factory disaster resulted when a shopping bag factory located at Sundar Industrial Estate near Lahore, Pakistan collapsed on 4 November 2015, killing at least 45 people and trapping about 150. The recovery was led by the Board of Management Sundar Industrial Estate with support from the Pakistan Army, Rescue 1122 and Bahria Town Rescue Team.

A large rescue operation included a team of army engineers and urban search-and-rescue personnel. Messages had been received via mobile phones from people trapped in the rubble. The challenge of getting heavy machinery to the site of the collapse hampered the rescue effort, according to an official as of 4 November .

The disaster has had a seminal effect on the operation and management of all industrial estates and their bylaws.

See also 
 2012 Pakistan garment factory fires

References 

Building collapses in 2015
2015 industrial disasters
2015 disasters in Pakistan
Lahore
Man-made disasters in Pakistan